Christopher B. Bala (born September 24, 1978) is an American former professional ice hockey player.

Biography
Bala was born in Alexandria, Virginia, but grew up in Phoenixville, Pennsylvania, where he attended the Hill School. As a youth, he played in the 1992 Quebec International Pee-Wee Hockey Tournament with the Philadelphia  Flyers minor ice hockey team.

Bala was drafted 58th overall by the Ottawa Senators in the 1998 NHL Entry Draft from Harvard University and played six regular season games for the Senators during the 2001–02 NHL season, scoring one assist. He played in the American Hockey League for most of his career with farms teams of the Minnesota Wild and the Colorado Avalanche. He then played for the Reading Royals in the ECHL.

He currently works at The Hill School, his alma mater.

Career statistics

Awards and honors

References

External links

1978 births
Living people
American men's ice hockey left wingers
Binghamton Senators players
Grand Rapids Griffins players
Harvard Crimson men's ice hockey players
Hershey Bears players
Houston Aeros (1994–2013) players
Ice hockey players from Pennsylvania
Ice hockey people from Virginia
Milwaukee Admirals players
Ottawa Senators draft picks
Ottawa Senators players
Sportspeople from Alexandria, Virginia
People from Phoenixville, Pennsylvania
Reading Royals players
The Hill School alumni
The Hill School faculty
Educators from Pennsylvania